Institute of Chemical Process Fundamentals, Academy of Sciences of the Czech Republic, v.v.i. is one of the six institutes belonging to the CAS chemical sciences section and is a research centre in a variety of fields such as chemistry, biochemistry, catalysis and environment.

Its research topics include multiphase reaction systems for the design of chemical synthesis chemical processes and new materials development, energetics and protection of environment. Its national and international reputation is ascertained by its participation in EU financed research projects, such as  EUCAARI or MULTIPRO. The MATINOES project was evaluated to belong to 20 best projects of the 6th Frame Programme.

History 
The institute was founded at the Czechoslovak Academy of Sciences in 1960 and, from its beginning, was intended to be a multidisciplinary research institution.

Its founder and first director, Professor Vladimír Bažant, was a chemical technologist with a broad perspective who valued modern concepts without which development of new processes would not be possible. This led him to invite Professor George L. Standart, a chemical engineer and a US native, who paved the way for the development of chemical engineering in the former Czechoslovakia in the 1950s and 60s. Chemical engineering research could not be done without a solid base in physical chemistry. This field of research was brought into the institute by the arrival in 1964 of Professor Eduard Hála and his team of physical chemists to the newly built site in the Prague suburban area of Suchdol-Lysolaje.

Gradually new branches of chemical engineering and chemical technology research were being developed such as reaction engineering, homogeneous catalysis, studies of Non-Newtonian fluids, sublimation, separation processes, dynamics and control of chemical systems etc. Most of these new topics were introduced as necessary support to a large and long-term project of development of a complete production technology of terephthalic acid a polyesters.

In 1989 several restructurings had been carried out that lead to a gradual decrease of staff by 50%. The research was rationalized into today's institute's structure.

Present 
The institute of chemical process fundamentals research activities currently include the theory of chemical processes especially in chemical engineering, physical chemistry, chemical technology and environmental engineering.

Main research activities 
 molecular theory and computer simulations of fluid systems
 thermodynamics of fluid systems, PVT behaviour of pure compounds and mixtures and phase equilibrium
 research and development of microreactors
 fundamentals of processes using supercritical fluids
 advanced catalytical processes, morphology, and properties of catalysts, preparation of catalysts
 study and preparation of nanomaterials and nanofibers
 texture of porous substances and transport phenomena in porous substances
 membrane separations, pervaporation a permeation
 study and application of biocatalysts, bioremediation
 structure, reactivity and catalytic activity of organometallic complexes
 NMR spectroscopy
 fluidized bed combustion and gasification 
 photochemical reactions in microwave field and microwave technology
 fluid dynamics and transport phenomena in multiphase systems
 rheologic properties of microdispersions and liquids
 aerosol chemistry and physics
 laser-induced chemical reactions and aerosol processes for preparation of new compounds and composites

Organization structure

Management 
Director: Ing. Michal Šyc, Ph.D.
Chairman of Institute Board: Dr. Ing. Vladimír Ždímal 
Scientific Secretary: Ing. Vladimír Církva, Dr.

Research departments 
Department of Membrane Separation Processes - Head: Ing. Pavel Izák, Ph.D., DSc. 
Department of Aerosols Chemistry and Physics - Head: Dr. Ing. Vladimír Ždímal
Department of Catalysis and Reaction Engineering - Head: Ing. Olga Šolcová, CSc. 
Department of Multiphase Reactors - Head: Doc. Ing. Marek Růžička, CSc.
Department of Analytical Chemistry - Head: Ing. Jan Sýkora, Ph.D. 
Department of Environmental Engineering - Head: Ing. Michal Šyc, Ph.D.
Department of Molecular and Mesoscopic Modelling - Head: prof. Ing. Lísal Martin, DSc.
Department of Laser Chemistry - Head: RNDr. Radek Fajgar, CSc.
Department of Advanced Materials and Organic Synthesis - Head: Ing. Jan Storch, Ph.D.
Department of Bioorganic Compounds and Nanocomposites - Head: Ing. Tomáš Strašák, Ph.D.

Supervisory board  
Prof. Ing. Vladimír Mareček, DrSc. - chairman

Institute board 
Dr. Ing. Vladimír Ždímal – chairman

Postgraduate studies 
Postgraduate studies are accredited by the Ministry of Education, Youth, and Sports of the Czech Republic for mutual programmes of ICPF and all the faculties of ICT Prague and other faculties of Czech universities in the following fields: 
Chemical engineering
Physical chemistry
Organic technology
Organic chemistry
Inorganic chemistry
Biotechnology
Chemistry and technology of environmental protection

Research projects 
ICPF research teams are currently working on dozens of interesting basic and applied scientific projects financed both from national and  foreign resources. Selected topics in the following list show the broadness and multi-disciplinarity of the research carried out in the institute's laboratories:

 F3 Factory - Flexible, fast and future production processes
 Study of polymeric membrane swelling and make use of this effect for increasing its permeability
 Separation of volatile organic compounds from air
 Optimization of supercritical fluid extraction for maximal yield of biologically active substances from plants
 Determination of the phase and state behaviour of fluids and fluid mixtures for process-es at superambient conditions: molecular-based theory and experiment
 Computer modelling of structural, dynamical and transport properties of fluids in nanospace
 Preparation of hierarchic nanomaterials
 HUGE2 - Hydrogen Oriented Underground Coal Gasification for Europe - Environmental and Safety Aspects
 Special catalytic processes and materials
 Modern theoretical methods for the analysis of chemical bonding
 Supported oxidic catalysts containing low amount of active species as catalysts for N2O decomposition
 Reactive chemical barriers for decontamination of heavily polluted waters
 Removing endocrine disruptors from wastewaters and drinking water using photocatalytic and biological processes
 Transport and reaction processes in complex multiphase systems
 Determination of the coalescence efficiency of bubbles in liquids
 Wall effect in flowing microdisperse liquids: apparent slip and electrokinetical potential
 Novel inorganic-organic hybrid nanomaterials
 Releasing hydrogen on formation of chemical bonds catalysed by titanium complexes
 Whole-cell optical sensors
 Preparation of helicene-based chiral stationary phases for HPLC 
 FLEXGAS - Near zero advanced fluidised bed gasification
 Advanced methods of fluid and burner coal and biomass co-gasification
 Waste as raw material and energy source
 Development and validation of thermal desorption technology using microwave radiation
 EUSAAR - European Supersites for Atmospheric Aerosol Research
 Influence of surface processes and electromagnetic radiation on transfer phenomena in aerosol systems with nanoparticles and porous bodies with nanopores
 Development and application of new experimental methods to measure heterogeneous particles in superheated steam
 Preparation of Ti/O/Si based photocatalysts by laser induced CVD and sol-gel technique

See also
Academy of Sciences of the Czech Republic

External links 
ICPF Homepage

Research institutes in the Czech Republic
Czech Academy of Sciences
1960 establishments in Czechoslovakia
Research institutes established in 1960
Chemical research institutes